North West 2 was an English Rugby Union league which was at the eighth tier of the domestic competition and was available to teams in North West England.  Promoted teams moved up to North West 1 while relegated teams dropped to North West 3.  The division was abolished at the end of the 1999–00 season due to RFU restructuring with teams being transferred to their relevant regional leagues such as South Lancs/Cheshire 1 or North Lancs/Cumbria.

Original teams
When league rugby began in 1987 this division contained the following teams:

Burnage
Cockermouth
Heaton Moor
Leigh
Macclesfield
Newton-le-Willows
Penrith
Sandbach
Sedgley Park
Warrington
Workington

North West 2 Honours

North West 2 (1987–1993)

The original North West 2 was a tier 8 league with promotion up to North West 1 and relegation down to either North-West East/North 1 or North-West West 1.

North West 2 (1993–1996)

The creation of National 5 North for the 1993–94 season meant that North West 2 dropped from being a tier 8 league to a tier 9 league for the years that National 5 North was active.

North West 2 (1996–2000)

The cancellation of National 5 North at the end of the 1995–96 season meant that North West 2 reverted to being a tier 8 league.  Additionally, the creation of North West 3 at tier 9 for the 1996–97, meant that relegated teams dropped to this new league.  At the end of the 1999–00 season a further restructure of the leagues saw North West 1, North West 2 and North West 3 cancelled, along with their counterparts North East 1, North East 2 and North East 3.

Number of league titles

Ashton-on-Mersey (1)
Caldy (1)
Cockermouth (1)
Leigh (1)
Manchester (1)
Old Aldwinians (1)
Oldershaw (1)
Sedgley Park (1)
St Edward's Old Boys (1)
Stockport (1)
Vagabonds (1)
Wilmslow (1)
Workington (1)

See also
 English Rugby Union Leagues
 English rugby union system
 Rugby union in England

Notes

References

Defunct rugby union leagues in England